Jack Cosgrove (born 1949) is an Irish former Gaelic footballer who played at various times with his local clubs Clifden, Midleton, St. Nicholas' and Spiddal, as well as at senior level for the Galway county team from 1971 until 1977. Cosgrove is a member of the set of Galway players who lost three All-Ireland SFC finals in four years.

References

1949 births
Living people
All Stars Awards winners (football)
Clifden Gaelic footballers
Gaelic football backs
Galway inter-county Gaelic footballers
Garda Síochána officers
Midleton Gaelic footballers
St Nicholas' Gaelic footballers
Spiddal Gaelic footballers